Serafim Pavlovich Subbotin (15 January 1921  22 April 1996) was a MiG-15 pilot of the Soviet Union. He was a flying ace during the Korean War, with around 9 victories. He was awarded Hero of the Soviet Union. Some sources claim he had up to 15 victories, though most sources indicate 9.

See also 
List of Korean War flying aces

References

Sources 

1921 births
1996 deaths
Russian aviators
Soviet Korean War flying aces
Soviet military personnel of the Korean War
Heroes of the Soviet Union
Soviet Air Force officers
Recipients of the Order of Lenin
Recipients of the Order of the Red Banner
People from Pervomaysky District, Yaroslavl Oblast
Soviet aviators